The Roman Catholic Diocese of Neiva is a diocese located in the city of Neiva in the Ecclesiastical province of Ibagué in Colombia.

History
 24 July 1972: Established as Diocese of Neiva from the Diocese of Garzón-Neiva

Ordinaries
Rafael Sarmiento Peralta (1972.07.24 – 1985.01.12) Appointed, Archbishop of Nueva Pamplona
Hernando Rojas Ramirez (1985.07.01 – 2001.01.19)
Ramón Darío Molina Jaramillo, O.F.M. (2001.01.19 –  2012.02.04)
Froilán Tiberio Casas Ortíz (since 2012.02.04)

See also
Roman Catholicism in Colombia
Immaculate Conception Cathedral, Neiva

Sources

External links
 Catholic Hierarchy
 GCatholic.org

Roman Catholic dioceses in Colombia
Roman Catholic Ecclesiastical Province of Ibagué
Christian organizations established in 1972
Roman Catholic dioceses and prelatures established in the 20th century